Alexander Arbuthnot, Snr (1654–1705) of Knox, Kincardineshire was a Scottish politician.

He was the second son of Robert Arbuthnott, 1st Viscount of Arbuthnott. He served as tutor to the children of his brother Robert Arbuthnot, 2nd Viscount of Arbuthnott.
 
He represented Kincardineshire as Commissioner to the Parliament of Scotland from 1689 to 1702.

He married firstly Margaret Barclay and secondly Jean Scott.

He should not be confused with Alexander Arbuthnot, an advocate and Provost who represented Bervie from 1703 to 1707.(p. 174)

References

External links

1654 births
1705 deaths
Shire Commissioners to the Parliament of Scotland
Members of the Parliament of Scotland 1689–1702
Arbuthnot family